Tarchonantheae is a tribe of plants within the Asteraceae, or sunflower family, of flowering plants.

Genera
Tarchonanthus L.
Brachylaena R.Br.

References

Carduoideae
Asteraceae tribes